Floristic diversity is variety in the genome of flowering plants, as well as variety at the species and ecosystem level.

References

External links 
 Floristic diversity in a model system using experimental microcosms

Biodiversity
Flowers